The Titanic Brewery is an independent producer of bottle conditioned and cask ales in Burslem, Stoke-on-Trent, England. One of the owners, Keith Bott MBE, was formerly the chairman of SIBA, the Society of Independent Brewers.

Titanic's beers are generally notable for their light colour, low malt, and high hop content, giving a very dry bitter taste, although Captain Smith's and some of their seasonal beers are dark and malty, though still extremely hoppy. Their seasonal ranges also include lighter and fruity ales such as 2019 seasonal beer, Kiwi Fleet, which is made with New Zealand hops.

History
The brewery was founded in Burslem, Stoke-on-Trent, in 1985 by brothers Keith and Dave Bott, and takes its name from the ill-fated steam liner Titanic. It is in honour of its captain Edward Smith (who came from Stoke-on-Trent) that the brewery is named.

Products
Its 'Fleet' range of beers include:

 Plum Porter (4.9% abv)
 Titanic Mild (3.5% abv)
 Steerage (formerly Titanic Best Bitter) (3.8% abv)
 Anchor ABV (4.1% abv)
 Iceberg (4.1% abv)
 Titanic Stout (4.5% abv)
 White Star (4.5% abv)
 Captain Smith's Strong Ale (5.2% abv)

All of these, bar the Mild are available in bottles from the brewery, the brewery tap, and many supermarkets including Asda and Morrisons. They produce over 4 million pints every year.

Titanic have also branched out into distilling their own gin.

Pubs

Titanic Brewery presently runs nine pubs in North Staffordshire, Derbyshire and Oxfordshire – The Bull's Head in Burslem, The White Star in Stoke, The Greyhound in Newcastle-under-Lyme, The Royal Exchange in Stone, The Sun Inn in Stafford, The Roebuck in Leek, The BOD in Newport, Shropshire, The Cheshire Cheese in Buxton, The Royal Blenheim in Oxford and the Old Poets Corner in Ashover.

Café bars

Titanic Brewery also runs three 'Bod' café bars in the Staffordshire area – in Stafford, Stoke-on-Trent railway station and Trentham.

Awards

The Titanic Brewery has won many awards, often awarded by CAMRA (the Campaign for Real Ale), from the 1990s to the present day.

The Titanic Brewery's bottled Stout beer's first award was Gold in the 1994 Guardian Bottled Beer of Britain, and more recently it won first place in the CAMRA West Midlands Beer of the Year 2009 (Stout Category).
Titanic's Iceberg Beer won its first award in 2002, achieving Gold in the CAMRA Champion Beer of the West Midlands category, and again more recently achieved first place in the CAMRA West Midlands Beer of the Year (Speciality Category).

References

External links
RateBeer

Companies based in Stoke-on-Trent
Privately held companies of the United Kingdom
RMS Titanic
Food and drink companies established in 1985
Breweries in England
British companies established in 1985
1985 establishments in England